Lestima is a village in Märjamaa Parish, Rapla County in western Estonia, on the right (east) bank of the Teenuse River.

References

Villages in Rapla County